The 2002 Liga Perdana 2 season is the fifth season of Liga Perdana 2. A total of 12 teams participated in the season.

Johor was relegated from Liga Perdana 1 to join the Liga Perdana 2. 

The season kicked off on 27 January 2002. Kedah won the title and was promoted to Liga Perdana 1 alongside TM.

Teams

12 teams competing in the fifth season of Liga Perdana 2.

 Kedah (2002 Liga Perdana 2 champions)
 Telekom Melaka
 MPPJ
 Selangor Public Bank FC
 Brunei
 Johor
 PDRM
 ATM
 Kelantan TNB
 Kelantan SKMK
 KL Malay Mail
 Kedah JKR

Fixtures and results

Fixtures and results of the Perdana Dua 2002 season.

Round 1
[Jan 27]

Round 2
[Feb 1]

Round 3
[Feb 8]

Round 4
[Feb 15]

Round 5
[Feb 18]

Round 6
[Feb 25]

Round 7
[Mar 1]

[Mar 2]

Round 8
[Mar 8]

Round 9
[Mar 18]

Round 10
[Mar 22]

Round 11
[Mar 25]

Round 12
[Apr 1]

Round 13
[Apr 5]

[Apr 6]

Round 14
[Apr 12]

Round 15
[Apr 19]

[Apr 20]

Round 16
[Apr 29]

[Apr 30]

Round 17
[May 3]

Round 18
[May 10]

[May 17]

[Jun 3]

Round 19
[May 27]

Round 20
[Jun 7]

Round 21
[Jun 14]

Round 22
[Jun 17]

[Jun 18]

League table

Champions

References

Liga Perdana 2 seasons
1
Malaysia